Mike Cawley (born August 28, 1972 in Pittsburgh, Pennsylvania) is a former professional American and Canadian football quarterback who played in the Canadian Football League, NFL Europe and the XFL. He was drafted by the Indianapolis Colts in the sixth round of the 1996 NFL Draft. He played college football at James Madison.

Professional career

Indianapolis Colts
Cawley was selected by the Indianapolis Colts in the sixth round (205th overall) of the 1996 NFL Draft. He was signed to the team's practice squad on August 27, 1996.

Hamilton Tiger-Cats
Cawley was signed as a free agent by the Hamilton Tiger-Cats on June 1, 1997. He also threw for 547 yards on 43 of 79 passing attempts with five touchdowns and four interceptions. During the  season, Cawley saw action in two games for Hamilton completing five of eight passes for 47 yards. He was released on October 19, 1998.

Saskatchewan Roughriders
Cawley was signed by Saskatchewan Roughriders on October 2, 1999. He was released on October 16.

Buffalo Bills
Cawley was signed by the Buffalo Bills on February 17, 2000. He was released during final roster cuts on August 27.

Calgary Stampeders
Cawley was signed by the Calgary Stampeders on September 20, 2000. He was released on November 10.

Las Vegas Outlaws
Cawley was selected 13th overall by the Las Vegas Outlaws in the XFL supplemental draft on December 29, 2000. Cawley served as the backup quarterback, but because of injuries to starter Ryan Clement, Cawley played several games as the Outlaws' starter. Cawley himself would end up injured, eventually ending his career.

References

External links
 Career NFL Europe statistics

1972 births
Living people
Players of Canadian football from Pittsburgh
Players of American football from Pittsburgh
American football quarterbacks
James Madison Dukes football players
Amsterdam Admirals players
Las Vegas Outlaws (XFL) players
American players of Canadian football
Canadian football quarterbacks
Hamilton Tiger-Cats players
Calgary Stampeders players